Le Génépi (2,884 m) is a mountain of the Swiss Mont Blanc massif, located west of Champex in the canton of Valais. It is the culminating point of the group lying north of the Fenêtre d'Arpette.

References

External links
 Le Génépi on Hikr

Mountains of the Alps
Mountains of Valais
Mountains of Switzerland
Two-thousanders of Switzerland
Mont Blanc massif